Charles Coote may refer to:

 Sir Charles Coote, 1st Baronet (1581–1642), English soldier and administrator in Ireland.
 Charles Coote, 1st Earl of Mountrath (died 1661), Irish peer
 Charles Coote (1694–1761), Irish politician, MP for Castlemartyr  1715–27
 Charles Coote (1695–1750), Irish politician, MP for Granard 1723–27, and for Cavan County 1727–50
 Charles Coote, 7th Earl of Mountrath (c. 1725–1802), Irish peer and landowner
 Charles Coote, 1st Earl of Bellomont (1738–1800), Irish politician, MP for Cavan County 1761–66, Postmaster General of Ireland 1789–97
 Charles Coote, 2nd Baron Castle Coote (1754–1823), Irish politician
 Sir Charles Coote, 9th Baronet (1794–1864), Irish Conservative and Tory politician
 Charles Henry Coote (1840–1899), librarian at the British Museum
 Sir Charles Algernon Coote, 4th Baronet (1847–1920), of the Coote baronets
 Charles Coote (priest, died 1780), Dean of Kilfenora
 Charles Coote (priest, died 1796), Dean of Kilfenora
 Charles Coote (cricketer) (1847–1893), Irish cricketer

See also

Coote (surname)